Elana Bell   is an American poet and educator. She is the author of the poetry collection, Eyes, Stones, winner of the 2011 Walt Whitman award of the Academy of American Poets.

Biography
Elana Bell was born in Venice Beach, California. She received a B.A. from Sarah Lawrence College in 1999 and an M.F.A. in creative writing at the college in 2008.

Bell's manuscript, Eyes, Stones, was awarded the 2011 Walt Whitman award of the Academy of American Poets. The poetry collection was published by Louisiana State University Press in 2012.

Bell has received grants from the Edward F. Albee Foundation, the Jerome Foundation and the Drisha Institute for her work.

Bell teaches creative writing workshops for women in prison, for educators, students, and the non-profit organization, Seeds of Peace.
She is currently the writer-in-residence for the Bronx Academy of Letters. She resides in Brooklyn, New York with her husband, writer Jai Chakrabarti.

Awards and recognition
 Winner, Walt Whitman award (2011)
 Finalist, Freedom Plow Award for Poetry and Activism, 2013

References 

Living people
Sarah Lawrence College alumni
21st-century American poets
21st-century American women writers
American women poets
Poets from California
Year of birth missing (living people)
People from Venice, Los Angeles
Writers from Los Angeles